Coolaroo railway station is located on the Craigieburn line in Victoria, Australia. It serves the northern Melbourne suburb of Coolaroo, and it opened on 6 June 2010.

History

Originally scheduled for completion by the 1980s, under the 1969 Melbourne Transportation Plan, the Victorian Government set aside $38 million for the construction of the station in the 2007/2008 State Budget. Completion was expected in 2010, with the project re-announced as part of the state government Victorian Transport Plan in December 2008. Although long proposed, the station was built separately to the 2007 electrification of the line from Broadmeadows to Craigieburn.

The railway past the site of Coolaroo station originally opened in 1872, as part of the North East line to School House Lane. In December 2008, to allow construction of Platform 1, work on the slewing of the parallel standard gauge track commenced, and was completed by January 2009. In August of that year, work on the lift wells was underway, with the main span of the footbridge lifted into place in October of that year.

On 6 June 2010, the station was opened by then Premier of Victoria, John Brumby, and then Minister for Transport, Martin Pakula.

Platforms and services

Coolaroo has two side platforms. It is serviced by Metro Trains' Craigieburn line services.

Platform 1:
  all stations services to Flinders Street

Platform 2:
  all stations services to Craigieburn

Transport links

Dysons operates one route via Coolaroo station, under contract to Public Transport Victoria:
 : Upfield station – Broadmeadows station

Kinetic Melbourne operates one SmartBus route via Coolaroo station, under contract to Public Transport Victoria:
  : Frankston station – Melbourne Airport

Ventura Bus Lines operates one route via Coolaroo station, under contract to Public Transport Victoria:
  : Broadmeadows station – Craigieburn (Saturday and Sunday mornings only)

References

External links

 Melway map at street-directory.com.au

Railway stations in Melbourne
Railway stations in Australia opened in 2010
Railway stations in the City of Hume